Duval is a surname, literally translating from French to English as "of the valley".  It derives from the Norman "Devall", which has both English and French ties. Variant spellings include: Davolls, Deavall, DeVile, Devill, Deville, Divall, Divell and de Eyvill. Its meaning is derived from the French town of Deville, Ardennes. "Devall" was first recorded in England in the Domesday Book.

In France, variant spellings include: Lavalle, Lavallie, Laval, Lavall, Deval, Lavell, Lavelle and Lavielle. The Duval surname has also been spelled some other ways including DeVall, Devoll, DeVol, DuVal, Duvall, DeValle and Devaulle.

Notable People
 Aimé Duval (1918–1984), also known as Père Duval, French priest, singer-songwriter, and guitarist
 Albert Duval, French Olympic sailing athlete
 Alexandre-Vincent Pineux Duval (1767–1842), French dramatist, sailor, architect, actor, and theater manager
 Alf Duval (born 1941), Australian rower
 Aline Duval  (1824–1903), French stage actress
 Amaury Duval (1760–1838), French lawyer, historian, diplomat, writer, and scholar
 André Duval (1920–2018), French-Canadian author and historian
 Armand Félix Marie Jobbé-Duval (1821–1889), French painter and politician 
 Aurélien Duval (born 1988), French cyclist
 Barry E. DuVal (born 1959), American politician
 Becky Duval Reese, American museum director
 Burr H. Duval (1809–1836), American soldier who died in the Texas Revolution, son of William Pope Duval
 Charles Allen Duval (1810–1872) British portrait painter, photographer, and writer
 Claude Duval (1643–1670), French highwayman
 Clément Duval (1850–1935), French anarchist and criminal
 Clive L. DuVal II (1912–2002), American politician and lawyer
 Consuelo Duval (born 1968), Mexican comedian and actress of film, television, theater, and voice-over
 Damon Duval (born 1980), American professional football player
 Daniel Duval (1944–2013), French actor, film director and screenwriter
 David Duval (born 1971), American golfer
 Denise Duval (1921–2016), French opera singer
 Dennis DuVal (born 1952), American retired basketball player
 Dominic Duval (c. 1944–2016), American free jazz bassist
 Edgar Raoul-Duval (1832–1887), French magistrate and politician
 Edwin M. Duval (born 1947), American literary scholar 
 Elsie Duval (1892–1919), British suffragist and campaigner
 Émile Duval (1907–1965), French long-distance runner
 Erik Duval (1965–2016), Belgian computer scientist
 Eugénie Duval (born 1993), French racing cyclist
 Eugène Emmanuel Amaury Duval (1808–1885), better known as Amaury-Duval, French painter
 Franca Duval (born 1925), American soprano
 François Duval (disambiguation), various people
 Frank Duval (born 1940), German composer, conductor, record producer, songwriter, and singer
 Frantz Duval, Haitian journalist
 Fred DuVal (born 1954), American businessman, civic leader, and author
 Gaël Duval (born 1973), French entrepreneur
 Gaëtan Duval (1930–1996), Mauritian barrister, statesman, and politician
 Georges Duval de Leyrit (fl. 1750s), French colonial governor
 Georges Duval (1772–1853), French playwright
 Georges Duval (journalist) (1847–1919), French playwright and journalist
 Isaac H. Duval (1824–1902), American Civil War general and Congressman
 James Duval (born 1972), American actor
 Jean Duval (1597–1669), Roman Catholic prelate, Bishop of Baghdad, and Bishop of Ispahan
 Jean-François-Joseph Duval QC (1802–1881), Quebec lawyer, judge, and political figure
 Jean-Jacques Duval (born 1930), French-born American artist
 Jean-Jacques Duval d'Eprémesnil (1745–1794), French magistrate and politician
 Jeanne Duval  (c. 1820 – c. 1862), Haitian-born actress and dancer
 John Crittenden Duval (1816–1897), American writer, son of William Pope Duval
 Joseph Duval (1928–2009), French Roman Catholic archbishop
 Joseph-Odilon Duval (1895–1966), Canadian politician
 Joseph Duval-Jouve (1810–1883), French botanist
 Julien Duval (born 1990), French professional racing cyclist
 Jules-Alexandre Duval Le Camus (1814–1878), French painter
 Léon-Étienne Duval (1903–1996), French prelate and cardinal
 Lil Duval, American stand-up comedian
 Loïc Duval (born 1982), French professional racing driver
 Lucie Duval (born 1959), Canadian artist
 Maïté Duval (1944-2019), French-Dutch sculptress
 Marcel Duval, Canadian air force general
 Maria Duval, Italian-born psychic scammer
 María Duval (born 1937), Mexican actress and singer
 Marie Duval (1847–1890), French cartoonist
 Mathias-Marie Duval (1844–1907), French professor of anatomy and histology
 Maurice Duval (1869–1958), French general and aviator
 Maurice Raoul-Duval (1866–1916), French polo player
 Michael Raoul Duval (1936–2001), American investment banker and lawyer
 Michel Duval (born 1994), Mexican actor, singer, songwriter, composer and model
 Miselaine Duval, Mauritian comedian, television producer, and writer
 Mlle Duval (1718–after 1775), French composer
 Noël Duval (1929–2018), French archaeologist
 Norma Duval (born 1956), a Spanish actress, presenter, and vedette
 Paulette Duval (1889–1951), French dancer and actress
 Philip Duval (1732–1808), English clergyman
 Pierre Duval, various people
 Portia Duval-Rigby (born 1970), Australian ice dancer
 Raymond Duval (1894–1955), French general
 Robbert Duval (1639–1732\), Dutch painter 
 Robin Duval (born 1941), British film censor
 Salluste Duval (1872–1917), Canadian doctor of medicine, inventor, engineer, organist, musician, and professor of mathematics and mechanics
 Stanwood Duval (born 1942), American judge
 Sunny Duval, Québécois rock guitarist and songwriter
 Sylvie Andrich-Duval (born 1958), Luxembourgish politician
 Thibaut Duval (born 1979), Belgian pole vaulter
 Thomas Howard DuVal (1813–1880), U.S. federal judge, son of William Pope Duval
 Trevon Duval (born 1998), American professional basketball player
 Una Duval (1879–1975), British suffragette and marriage reformer
 Victoria Duval, American professional tennis player
 William Duval (ice hockey) (1877–1905), Canadian professional ice hockey player
 William Pope Duval (1784–1854), American governor of the Florida Territory
 Xavier Barsalou-Duval (born 1988), Canadian politician
 Xavier-Luc Duval (born 1958), Mauritian politician
 Yves Duval (1934–2009), Belgian comics author
 Yvette Duval (1931–2006), Moroccan-born French historian

Characters
Dr. Peter Duval, fictional character, Fantastic Voyage

See also
 Duvall (surname)

References 

French-language surnames